Scutuloidea is a genus of isopods. All species in this genus are endemic to New Zealand.

Species
 Scutuloidea kutu
 Scutuloidea maculata

References

Crustaceans described in 1883
Sphaeromatidae
Marine crustaceans of New Zealand
Endemic fauna of New Zealand
Endemic crustaceans of New Zealand